Chiang Shu-na (born 30 July 1964) is a Taiwanese singer, television presenter, and actress.

Life and career
Chiang Shu-na is affectionately nicknamed "Third Sister", while her older sister Jody Chiang, also a well-known singer, is nicknamed "Second Sister". The sisters have completely different professional careers: Jody has recorded almost exclusively in Hokkien and Japanese, while Chiang Shu-na mainly performs in Mandarin, but they are very close personally. Growing up in sheer poverty, she and Jody started performing together in restaurants and pubs when she was just 10. This life lasted 5 years.

Chiang Shu-na shot to fame in the 1980s after singing the theme songs of popular TV series Lovers Under the Rain (1986), Deep Garden (1987), and One Side of the Water (1988), all adaptations of Chiung Yao novels. To date Chiang Shu-na has released 19 albums, and won several accolades including Best Female Mandarin Artist at the 2011 Chinese Music Awards. Also a talented television host, she won Golden Bell Award for Best TV Host in a Music/Singing Programme twice, in 2004 and 2007. In addition, Chiang Shu-na has maintained an active acting career in Taiwan, Hong Kong as well as mainland China.

Filmography

Television series

Film

References

External links

 Taiwan Today, "The Sound of Firecrackers."
 Taiwan Panorama, "True Love, or Cheap Sentimentality?--Variety Shows Turn on the Tear Ducts."

1964 births
Living people
20th-century Taiwanese actresses
21st-century Taiwanese actresses
Taiwanese Buddhists
Taiwanese film actresses
Taiwanese television actresses
Taiwanese Mandopop singers
Taiwanese Hokkien pop singers
Taiwanese people of Hoklo descent
People from Chiayi County
20th-century Taiwanese women singers
21st-century Taiwanese women singers
Taiwanese women television presenters